Anterior interosseous syndrome  is a medical condition in which damage to the anterior interosseous nerve (AIN), a distal motor and sensory branch of the median nerve, classically with severe weakness of the pincer movement of the thumb and index finger, and can cause transient pain in the wrist (the terminal, sensory branch of the AIN innervates the bones of the carpal tunnel).

Most cases of AIN syndrome are now thought to be due to a transient neuritis, although compression of the AIN in the forearm is a risk, such as pressure on the forearm from immobilization after shoulder surgery.  Trauma to the median nerve or around the proximal median nerve have also been reported as causes of AIN syndrome.

Although there is still controversy among upper extremity surgeons, AIN syndrome is now regarded as a neuritis (inflammation of the nerve) in most cases; this is similar to Parsonage–Turner syndrome.  Although the exact etiology is unknown, there is evidence that it is caused by an immune-mediated response that can follow other illnesses, such as pneumonia or severe viral illness.

Studies are limited, and no randomized controlled trials have been performed regarding the treatment of AIN syndrome.  While the natural history of AIN syndrome is not fully understood, studies following patients who have been treated without surgery show that symptoms can resolve starting as late as one year after onset.  Other retrospective studies have concluded that there is no difference in outcome in surgically versus nonsurgically treated patients.  The role of surgery in AIN syndrome remains controversial.  Indications for considering surgery include a known space-occupying lesion that is compressing the nerve (a mass) or fascial compression, and persistent symptoms beyond 1 year of conservative treatment.

Symptoms and signs

Patients may experience poorly localised, transient pain in the wrist, i.e. where the sensory branch of the AIN is mapped in the brain. The pain is sometimes referred into the cubital fossa and elbow pain has been reported as being a primary complaint.⁠
The characteristic severe impairment of the pincer movement of the thumb and index finger is most striking.

Clinical signs 

In a pure lesion of the anterior interosseous nerve there is weakness of the long flexor muscle of the thumb (Flexor pollicis longus), the deep flexor muscles of the index  and middle fingers (Flexor digitorum profundus I & II), and the pronator quadratus muscle.

There is no sensory deficit since the anterior interosseous nerve has no cutaneous branch to skin, but there is a large sensory branch to the volar carpus, and transient wrist pain may be experienced.

Causes 

Injuries of the forearm with compression of the nerve from swelling is the most common cause: examples include supracondylar fractures, often associated with haemorrhage into the deep musculature; injury secondary to open reduction of a forearm fracture; or dislocation of the elbow.⁠⁠

Direct trauma from a penetrating injury such as a stab wound is a possible cause for the syndrome.

Fibrous bands or Arcuate ligament~arcuate (curved) ligaments may entrap the median as well as the anterior interosseous nerve, in which case a patient may experience hand numbness as well as wrist pain.⁠⁠

Very similar syndromes can be caused by more proximal lesions, such as brachial plexus neuritis.⁠

Anterior interosseous nerve entrapment or compression injury remains a difficult clinical diagnosis because it is mainly a motor nerve problem, and the syndrome is often mistaken for index finger and/or thumb tendon injury.⁠

Anatomy 

The anterior interosseous nerve is a branch of the median nerve, with a large sensory branch to the wrist bones, which arises just below the elbow. It passes distally, anteriorly along the interosseous membrane and innervates flexor pollicis longus, flexor digitorum profundus to index and middle finger as well as pronator quadratus, and supplies sensory feedback from the wrist bones, i.e. the carpal tunnel, not skin.

Diagnosis 

Electrophysiologic testing is an essential part of the evaluation of anterior interosseous nerve syndrome. Nerve conduction studies may be normal or show pronator quadratus latency.⁠⁠
Electromyography (EMG) is generally most useful and will reveal abnormalities in the flexor pollicis longus, flexor digitorum profundus I and II and pronator quadratus muscles.⁠⁠

The role or MRI and ultrasound imaging in the diagnosis of Kiloh-Nevin syndrome is unclear.⁠

If asked to make the "OK" sign, patients will make a triangle sign instead. This 'pinch-test' exposes the weakness of the flexor pollicis longus muscle and the flexor digitorum profundus I leading to weakness of the flexion of the distal phalanges of the thumb and index finger. This results in impairment of the pincer movement and the patient will have difficulty picking up a small item, such as a coin, from a flat surface.

Ericson's Test

Ericson's Test is a clinical maneuver for assessing the strength of the FDP and FPL muscles in anterior interosseous nerve syndrome, and other proximal entrapments of the median nerve.

In contrast to the "OK sign," Ericson's test isolates the action of the FDP and FPL while eliminating the contribution of the tenodesis effect and other adaptations that patients may use, usually unconsciously, to augment distal pincer strength.  Failing to control for compensatory wrist tenodesis  can mask an underlying proximal median nerve weakness in a patient who can otherwise make a normal OK-sign.

While facing the patient in what resembles an arm wrestling stance, with elbows planted firmly on a level surface and maintained touching the thorax, the examiner uses one hand to lock the patient's wrist in neutral, around which the patient curls his fingers. With the other hand, the examiner then attempts to "peel" back the tips of each individual finger against patient resistance. It is crucial that motion of the upper extremity be restricted to the distal IP joint, and that the MP and PIP joints are in full flexion and wrist neutral or slightly flexed. If the distal flexors of the index finger and thumb are weak, the patient will be unable to resist this motion, and Ericson's test is considered positive for proximal median nerve weakness.

Ericson's test is frequently positive for proximal median nerve weakness (of which AIN syndrome is but one subtype) even in the context of normal imaging, EMG, and nerve conduction studies, which highlights the clinical nature of the diagnosis. Overreliance on electrical diagnostic workup unfairly excludes patients who would otherwise benefit from surgical decompression.

Treatment 

Surgical decompression can give excellent results if the clinical picture and the EMG suggest a compression neuropathy.
In brachial plexus neuritis, conservative management may be more appropriate.
Spontaneous recovery has been reported, but is said to be delayed and incomplete.

There may be a role for physiotherapy in some cases, and this should be directed specifically towards the pattern of pain and symptoms. Soft tissue massage, stretches and exercises to directly mobilise the nerve tissue may be used.⁠

History 

The syndrome was first described by Parsonage and Turner in 1948⁠ and further defined as isolated lesion of the anterior interosseous nerve by Leslie Gordon Kiloh and Samuel Nevin in 1952.

References

External links 

Neurological disorders
Mononeuropathies of upper limb
Syndromes